Borbacha is a genus of moths in the family Geometridae.

Species
 Borbacha altipardaria Holloway, 1982
 Borbacha bipardaria Holloway, 1982
 Borbacha euchrysa (Lower, 1894)
 Borbacha monopardaria Holloway, 1982
 Borbacha pardalis (Felder & Rogenhofer, 1875)
 Borbacha pardaria (Guenée, 1857)
 Borbacha punctipardaria Holloway, 1982

References
 Borbacha at Markku Savela's Lepidoptera and Some Other Life Forms
Natural History Museum Lepidoptera genus database

Baptini